Pakihi Island is a privately-owned island located in the Hauraki Gulf to the east of the city of Auckland, New Zealand. It is located 1 km southwest of Ponui Island, and 1.5 km offshore from Waitawa Regional Park.

Description 

The island's land use is primarily pastoral and plantations, but with some areas of native vegetation.

History 

The island was purchased from Sir John Logan Campbell by the McCallum family in 1894 (along with the neighbouring, much smaller Karamuramu Island). William Fraser McCallum and his brothers created a partnership in 1904 and quarried red chert on the island from 1906 until 1927, used extensively to create concrete structures in the growing city of Auckland. As a wharf, they sank the first iron ship built in Auckland, the 1876 Rotomahana.

References

External links 

 1930 photo of SS Rotomahana (1876) sunk on shingle spit

Islands of the Hauraki Gulf
Islands of the Auckland Region
Private islands of New Zealand
Populated places in the Auckland Region
Populated places around the Hauraki Gulf / Tīkapa Moana